Aline is a French musical pop rock band formed in 2009 as Young Michelin. But the band had to change their name after the tire company Michelin demanded the change. Originally the band was made of 5 musicians based in Marseille, namely lead singer and rhythm guitarist Romain Guerret, lead guitarist Arnaud Pilard, bass player Romain Leiris, drummer Vincent Pedretti and keyboard player Laurent Maudoux. When Maudoux left in 2011, he was not replaced, rendering it a four-member band.  

Prior to Young Michelin, Romain Guerret had another music project named Dondolo and had released two albums (Dondolisme in 2007 and Une vie de plaisir dans un monde nouveau, whose release was postponed to 2010). 

But by 2009, Guerret had started the Young Michelin project with a number of releases. It also found great reception, and in 2009, their first digital single as Young Michelin ("Je suis fatigué" / "Les Copains") earned them the top award at "CQFD: Ceux qu'il faut découvrir" organized by Les Inrockuptibles. They also released a vinyl EP in 2010 made up of 4 songs ("Je suis fatigué" / "Elle m'oubliera" / "Obscène" / "Teen Whistle") on La Bulle Sonore label. 

In 2011, they released jointly with Pop at Summer a split EP under the title Elle et moi and in 2012, yet another vinyl EP of their own containing 4 songs ("Je bois et puis je danse" / "Hélas" / "Deux hirondelles" / "Je bois et puis je danse (Gambit Mix)"). This latter was their first release as Aline, the new adopted name of the band.  

Aline's debut album, Regarde le ciel, was released in January 2013 on IDOL/PIAS France label. The album is produced by Jean-Louis Piérot (ex member of Les Valentins) and recording and mixing is by Philippe Balzé. Laurent Maudoux did not take part in the album citing "personal reasons". Although there was no replacement of the leaving keyboardist of the band, in live shows, Jérémy Monteiro takes part without becoming a permanent member of the formation.

Discography

Albums

EPs and singles
as  Young Michelin
2009: "Je suis fatigué" / "Les Copains" (digital single)
2010: "Elle m’oubliera" / "Les Éclaireurs" (digital single)
2010: "Je suis fatigué" / "Elle m’oubliera" / "Obscène" / "Teen Whistle" (vinyl EP)
2011: "Elle et moi" / "Hélas" (Split EP with Pop at Summer) (vinyl)
as Aline
2012: "Je bois et puis je danse" / "Hélas" / "Deux hirondelles" / "Je bois et puis je danse (Gambit Mix)" (vinyl EP and digital downloads)

References

External links
Aline blog 

French rock music groups
Organizations based in Marseille